Janice Pariat is an Indian poet and writer. She was born in Assam and grew up in Shillong, Meghalaya.

Boats on Land (Random House India, 2012), her debut collection of short stories, won the 2013 Sahitya Akademi Young Writer Award for the English language and the 2013 Crossword Book Award for fiction. Pariat is the first writer from Meghalaya to receive an award from the Sahitya Akademi for a work in English.

Early life and career
Pariat was born in Jorhat, Assam, and grew up between Shillong and several tea estates in Assam. She was educated at Loreto Convent, Shillong and The Assam Valley School. Thereafter she obtained a BA in English Literature from St. Stephen's College, Delhi and an MA in History of Art and/or Archaeology from SOAS, University of London.

She is the editor of online literary journal Pyrta, which she founded in 2010. Her writing has featured in a number of Indian and international magazines, such as Time Out Delhi, The Caravan and Internazionale. Pariat teaches Creative Writing and History of Art at Ashoka University.

Awards and honours
In 2013, Pariat's debut collection of short stories Boats on Land won the Sahitya Akademi Young Writer Award for the English language, and a Crossword Book Award (fiction). The same work was also shortlisted for the 2013 Shakti Bhatt First Book Prize, and longlisted for the 2013 uday lakhanpal International Short Story Award and the 2013 Tata Literature Live! First Book Award. Seahorse was shortlisted for The Hindu Literary Prize (2015).

Style
In Boats on Land, Pariat's stories – set between Shillong, Cherrapunji and Assam – undertake fictional re-imaginings of the transformations that swept through Northeast India during a period of three centuries, starting in the 1850s. Weaving together local folklore and tradition with unfolding social and political events, Pariat's style has been likened to magical realism as well as to Haruki Murakami's writing. Jeet Thayil commented on her stories to be 'revelatory and original'.

Bibliography

Fiction
Everything the Light Touches, HarperCollins, 2022. 
The Nine-Chambered Heart, HarperCollins India, New Delhi, 2017. 
Seahorse: A novel, Random House India, New Delhi, 2014. 
 Boats on Land: A collection of short stories, Random House India, New Delhi, 2012.

Poetry
 The Yellow Nib Modern English Poetry by Indians (Sudeep Sen ed.), Seamus Heaney Centre for Poetry, Queen's University Belfast, 2011 .
 Kavi Kala: The Visual Poetry Project (Madness Manali ed.), Cinnamon Teal Print and Publishing, Goa, 2010.

See also
 Literature from North East India
 Indian English Literature
 Stephanian School of Literature

Gallery

References

Women writers from Meghalaya
English-language writers from India
Living people
Indian women poets
St. Stephen's College, Delhi alumni
Poets from Meghalaya
21st-century Indian women writers
21st-century Indian poets
People from Jorhat district
People from Shillong
Poets from Assam
Women writers from Assam
Year of birth missing (living people)